Sansome is a surname. Notable people with the surname include:

 Eva Sansome (1906–2001), British mycologist
 F. W. Sansome (1902–1981), British botanist
 Paul Sansome (born 1961), English footballer

See also
 Sansom